Spotted porcelain crab is a common name for several crabs and may refer to:

Neopetrolisthes maculatus, native to the Indo-Pacific Ocean
Porcellana sayana, native to the western Atlantic Ocean

Porcelain crabs